The Mitchell–Tibbetts House (also known as the Miner House) is a historic home in Apopka, Florida. It is located at 21 East Orange Street. On November 7, 1991, it was added to the U.S. National Register of Historic Places.

The house was built for R.N. Mitchell, a pioneer in the Apopka area. It was later owned by George W. Tibbetts, a general in the Union Army.

References

External links
 Orange County listings at National Register of Historic Places
 Orange County listings at Florida's Office of Cultural and Historical Programs

Houses on the National Register of Historic Places in Florida
National Register of Historic Places in Orange County, Florida
Houses in Orange County, Florida
Apopka, Florida
Houses completed in 1887
Vernacular architecture
I-houses in Florida
1887 establishments in Florida